Jamie Mulgrew (born 5 June 1986) is a professional footballer from Northern Ireland who plays for Linfield of the NIFL Premiership and who has been capped by the Northern Ireland national team.

Club career
Mulgrew began his career with Glentoran, making two senior appearances during the 2004–05 season. In 2005, he moved to Glentoran's rivals Linfield and quickly became a fixture with the first team squad. He was named as Linfield's Player of the Season for 2010 and as of the end of the 2019–20 season had appeared 589 times for the club in all competitions, having scored 45 goals.

It was reported by the Belfast Telegraph on 8 February 2011 that Scottish Premier League clubs Kilmarnock and Hibernian, along with Major League Soccer club Portland Timbers, were interested in signing Mulgrew on a Bosman free transfer when his contract expires in the summer.

In 2011, Mulgrew had trials with Major League Soccer sides Columbus Crew and Portland Timbers.

He was named Ulster Footballer of the Year and Northern Ireland Football Writers' Association Player of the Year for the 2016–17 season.

International career
He has been capped at the under-21 level for his country, playing against Moldova in a UEFA Under-21 European Championship qualifying match.

He made his full debut for Northern Ireland on 26 May 2010 against Turkey in a friendly.

Honours

Club
Linfield
 IFA Premiership/NIFL Premiership: 2006–07, 2007–08, 2009–10, 2010–11, 2011–12, 2016–17, 2018–19, 2019–20, 2020–21
 Irish Cup: 2006–07, 2007–08, 2009–10, 2010–11, 2011–12, 2016–17, 2020–21
 Irish League Cup: 2007–08, 2018–19, 2022-23 Northern Ireland Football League Cup|2018–19]]
 County Antrim Shield: 2005–06, 2013–14, 2016–17
 NIFL Charity Shield: 2017

Individual
Linfield Player of the Year: 2009–10
Northern Ireland Football Writers' Association Player of the Year: 2016–17
Ulster Footballer of the Year: 2016–17

References

External links

Association footballers from Northern Ireland
Living people
Northern Ireland under-21 international footballers
Linfield F.C. players
Glentoran F.C. players
Northern Ireland international footballers
1986 births
NIFL Premiership players
Ulster Footballers of the Year
Northern Ireland Football Writers' Association Players of the Year
Association football midfielders